David Esseni from the University of Udine, Udine, Italy was named Fellow of the Institute of Electrical and Electronics Engineers (IEEE) in 2013 for contributions to characterization and modeling of mobility and quasi-ballistic transport in MOS transistors.

References

Fellow Members of the IEEE
Living people
Year of birth missing (living people)
Place of birth missing (living people)
Academic staff of the University of Udine